Lyon Capitale is a French monthly magazine, created in 1994, talks about Lyon and its region Rhône-Alpes.

History and profile
Lyon Capitale was created in 1994 by  Jean Olivier Arfeuillere, Philippe Chaslot, Mathieu Thai and Anne-Caroline Jambaud. It is published on a monthly basis. In 2008 the magazine was acquired by a media company, Fiducial.

References

External links
 

1994 establishments in France
French-language magazines
Local interest magazines
Magazines established in 1994
Magazines published in France
Mass media in Lyon
Monthly magazines published in France